The following Confederate Army units and commanders fought in the First Battle of Deep Bottom (July 27–29, 1864) of the American Civil War. The Union order of battle is listed separately.

Abbreviations used

Military rank
 Gen = General
 LTG = Lieutenant General
 MG = Major General
 BG = Brigadier General
 Col = Colonel
 Ltc = Lieutenant Colonel
 Maj = Major
 Cpt = Captain
 Lt = 1st Lieutenant

Other
 w = wounded

Confederate Forces

Army of Northern Virginia

Gen Robert E. Lee

First Corps

LTG Richard H. Anderson

See also

 Virginia in the American Civil War
 Siege of Petersburg

American Civil War orders of battle